Teen Dream is a 2010 album by Beach House.

Teen Dream (band), American R&B group
"Teen Dream", a 1977 song by  Shaun Cassidy from Born Late
"Teen Dream", a 1995 song by Teen Angels 
"Teen Dream", a 1995 song by Urusei Yatsura

See also
Teenage Dream (disambiguation)